The Comemoração River is a river of Rondônia state in western Brazil. A Permanent Preservation Area is located in the river's watershed catchment.

Habitation
The Rondon commission noted the ipoteaute tribe were dominant in the upper regions of the river while the tacuatepes were present near the river's mouth.

See also
List of rivers of Rondônia

References

Brazilian Ministry of Transport

Rivers of Rondônia